Myrrhinutta or Myrrinoutta was a deme of ancient Attica, of the phyle of Aegeis, sending one delegate to the Athenian Boule. 

Its site is located near modern Nea Makri.

References

Populated places in ancient Attica
Former populated places in Greece
Demoi